Karula is a village in Valga Parish, Valga County in Estonia.

References

Villages in Valga County
Kreis Werro